ECTC may refer to:
 Ectoine synthase, an enzyme
 East Carolina University